Igandu is a village in central Tanzania. It is in the Ward of the same name which is part of Chamwino District

Transport 

Igandu has a station on the Central Railway of Tanzanian Railways.  It is near the site of the disastrous Igandu train disaster. A new station on the new Standard Gauge Railway is nearing completion in early 2023.

See also 

 Railway stations in Tanzania

References 

Populated places in Dodoma Region